Jennifer Lea Stow is deputy director (research), NHMRC Principal Research Fellow and head of the Protein Trafficking and Inflammation laboratory at the Institute for Molecular Bioscience (IMB), The University of Queensland, Australia. She was awarded her PhD from Monash University in Melbourne in 1982. As a Fogarty International Fellow, she completed postdoctoral training at Yale University School of Medicine (US) in the Department of Cell Biology. She was then appointed to her first faculty position as an assistant professor at Harvard University in the Renal Unit, Departments of Medicine and Pathology at the Massachusetts General Hospital in Boston. At the end of 1994 she returned to Australia as a Wellcome Trust Senior International Medical Research fellow at The University of Queensland where her work has continued. Stow sits on national and international peer review and scientific committees and advisory boards. She has served as head of IMB's Division of Molecular Cell Biology, and in 2008 she was appointed as deputy director (research).

Biography
Jenny Stow completed her tertiary education at Monash University Melbourne. Her undergraduate science degree was followed by an honours year (Hons 1st class) in the Department of Immunology and Pathology and a PhD (1979–1982) in the Department of Anatomy and Prince Henry's Hospital, under the supervision of Professors Eric Glasgow and Robert Atkins. Stow's PhD project involved characterizing cell populations in glomerulonephritis, and included the use of electron microscopy.

She was then awarded a Fogarty International Fellowship for postdoctoral training in the Department of Cell Biology at Yale University School of Medicine, US, where she worked with one of the luminaries of cell biology and nephrology, Dr Marilyn Farquhar. Stow, Farquhar and colleagues published seminal studies on glomerular basement membranes and proteoglycans.

Upon leaving Yale, Stow took up her first faculty position as an assistant professor in the Renal Unit at Massachusetts General Hospital at Harvard University. Stow and colleagues published important findings on secretion in polarized epithelial cells and published the first evidence showing trimeric G proteins functioning in membrane trafficking.

At the end of 1994 Stow returned to Australia as a Wellcome Trust Senior Medical Research Fellow to set up a cell biology laboratory at the University of Queensland in Brisbane. The Centre she joined later became of Australia's largest research institutes, UQ's Institute for Molecular Bioscience, where she has served as a group leader, professor and principal research fellow of the NHMRC.

Appointed head of IMB's Division of Molecular Cell Biology and then subsequently as deputy director (research) at IMB, Stow has performed roles in science, teaching and training and research policy. Her focus has been in cell biology, where her interest in protein trafficking and secretion is pursued using techniques such as microscopy and fluorescence imaging. Her current work in inflammation and cancer focuses on trafficking in epithelial cells and on cytokine secretion in macrophages. She is known for discovering new pathways for secretion and recycling in cells and for defining new functions for the cell machinery, including large and small G proteins, myosins and SNAREs.

Career history

2008-current, National Health and Medical Research Council (NHMRC) Principal Research Fellow, professorial research fellow, The University of Queensland
current, deputy director (research) and group leader, Institute for Molecular Bioscience, jointly appointed to School of Biomedical Science, The University of Queensland (renewed 2012)
2006–2008, division head and professor, Division of Molecular Cell Biology, Institute for Molecular Bioscience, The University of Queensland
2001–2006, NHMRC Principal Research Fellow (continuing), associate professor and group leader, Institute for Molecular Bioscience and Faculty of Biological and Chemical Sciences, The University of Queensland, Brisbane, Australia
2000, principal research fellow (continuing), associate professor and group leader, Centre for Molecular and Cellular Biology (now the IMB) and Department of Biochemistry, The University of Queensland, Brisbane, Australia
1994–1999, Wellcome Trust Senior Research Fellow (fixed term), associate professor and group leader, Centre for Molecular and Cellular Biology (now the IMB) and Department of Biochemistry, The University of Queensland, Brisbane, Australia
1989–1995, assistant professor, Departments of Medicine and Pathology, Massachusetts General Hospital/Harvard Medical School, Boston, US
1985–1988, research scientist and Swebelius Cancer Research fellow, Department of Cell Biology, Yale University School of Medicine, Connecticut, US
1982–1985, Fogarty International Research Postdoctoral fellow, Department of Cell Biology, Yale University School of Medicine, Connecticut, US. Mentor: Prof. Marilyn G. Farquhar

Career highlights

1982 PhD awarded, Monash University, Melbourne Australia
1982 Fogarty International Fellowship for postdoctoral work at Yale University School of Medicine
1985 Produced first antibody to basement membrane HSPG and localized glomerular filter HSPG
1986 Swebeilius Cancer Research fellowship, US
1987 Discovered mechanism for pH dependent sorting in epithelial cells
1988 Appointment at Harvard University/Massachusetts General Hospital as Assistant Professor
1990 Discovered new role for heterotrimeric G proteins in trafficking
1990 First independent NIH RO1 grant awarded
1991 PI and Core Director, Renal Cell Biology NIH program
1993 Established investigator of the American Heart Association
1994 Wellcome Trust Senior Medical Research Fellowship
1994 Appointed as associate professor to The University of Queensland, Brisbane, Australia
1999 Discovered new recycling pathway for E-cadherin trafficking and regulation
2001 NHMRC Principal Research Fellowship (5-year career award)
2001 Appointed as Associate Editor of American Journal of Physiology
2005 Appointed as Professorial Research Fellow University of Queensland
2005 Discovered new pathway for cytokine secretion in macrophages
2007 State Winner, Smart Women/Smart State Award, Queensland Australia
2008 Chair of Grant Review Committee for Human Frontier Science Program
2008 Appointed Deputy Director (Research) Institute for Molecular Bioscience
2008 Appointed to Editorial Board of the journal Physiology
2009 Davson Distinguished Lecturer for the American Physiological Society
2009 Appointed to Medical Research Advisory Committee, Australian Cancer Research Foundation
2010 Discovered role for PI3K in cell secretion and inflammation
2011 Walter Mackenzie Visiting Speaker, University of Alberta, Canada
2014 Discovered role for PI3K and Rab8 in regulating inflammation
2019 Elected to EMBO

Selected publications

References

External links 
 Stow Lab homepage, UQ, IMB
 Jenny Stow, IMB profile
 Jennifer L. Stow, Google scholar profile

 

Australian women scientists
Living people
Year of birth missing (living people)